Johann Gottfried Reiff was a German philologist. He published an edition of Artemidorus's Oneirocritica in 1805.

References

Year of birth missing
Year of death missing
German philologists